Terry Black  (February 3, 1949 – June 28, 2009) was a Canadian pop singer and teen idol, born in Vancouver, British Columbia.

Career
Black's debut U.S. single, "Unless You Care", was released in 1964, when Black was 15.  The song was written and produced by P. F. Sloan and Steve Barri and featured backing from Glen Campbell and Leon Russell, who were at that time studio musicians. The song was a major hit in Canada and also cracked the U.S. Billboard Hot 100, and Black was awarded the "Male Vocalist of the Year" award at the Maple Music Awards in 1965.

Black had several further singles through 1966, such as the Sloan-Barri tunes "Kisses for My Baby" and "Say It Again", Sam Cooke's "Only Sixteen", and "Baby's Gone" (written by Graham Bonney and Barry Mason), all of which were produced by Sloan and Barri. He released a Sloan-Barri produced album, Only 16 in 1965, on the Canadian ARC Records label. Black then moved to the U.S., and his remaining unreleased tracks (plus some alternate versions of released songs) were assembled into another Sloan-Barri produced album, The Black Plague, in 1966.

Under the name "Terence" he released the album An Eye for An Ear on Decca Records in the U.S. in 1969. The album was also released with a different cover by MCA Records in Germany, but it went unreleased in Canada and few, if any, copies were distributed there. A hoped-for film career failed to materialize, and Black returned to Canada.

Black also joined the cast for the Toronto production of Hair in 1969. He also performed, alongside Ward, with Dr. Music, including the 1972 Canadian hit "Sun Goes By". In 1979, Black performed the song "Moondust" on the soundtrack for the movie Meatballs. Black and Ward divorced in 1993.

In the 2000s, Black hosted an oldies radio show in British Columbia. He had multiple sclerosis late in life and died as a result of the condition on June 28, 2009, in Kamloops, British Columbia, Canada.

Discography

Albums

Solo

with Laurel Ward

with Dr. Music

Singles

Solo

with Laurel Ward

with Dr. Music

References

1949 births
2009 deaths
Canadian pop singers
20th-century Canadian male singers
Deaths from multiple sclerosis
Neurological disease deaths in British Columbia